The Sayre Champlin Service Station is a historic service station located on old U.S. Route 66 in Sayre, Oklahoma. The station, an affiliate of the Champlin Refining Company, was built in 1934; it replaced an older station which predated Route 66. Its main building has a Streamline Moderne design which features oval pilasters and horizontal sections, plate glass and multi-light windows, and a contrasting color scheme. The station provided both gasoline and automobile services to Route 66 travelers; in addition, the large tanker trucks used to supply the station's gasoline contributed to the highway's traffic. After Interstate 40 bypassed Route 66 in 1958, business at the station declined, and it closed permanently in 1967.

The station was added to the National Register of Historic Places on March 3, 2004.

References

External links

Gas stations on the National Register of Historic Places in Oklahoma
Streamline Moderne architecture in Oklahoma
Commercial buildings completed in 1934
Buildings and structures in Beckham County, Oklahoma
U.S. Route 66 in Oklahoma
Buildings and structures on U.S. Route 66
National Register of Historic Places in Beckham County, Oklahoma
1934 establishments in Oklahoma